Tereza Obunyu Engesha (born 15 February 1998), known as Terry Engesha, is a Kenyan professional footballer who plays as a forward for South Korean WK League club Hyundai Steel Red Angels and the Kenya women's national team.

International career 
Engesha made her senior debut for Kenya in October 2021 during a 2022 Africa Women Cup of Nations qualifying match against South Sudan.

See also
List of Kenya women's international footballers

References 

1998 births
Living people
Kenyan women's footballers
Women's association football forwards
Kenya women's international footballers
WK League players
Incheon Hyundai Steel Red Angels WFC players
Kenyan expatriate footballers
Expatriate women's footballers in South Korea